The Coalition of Graduate Employee Unions consists of unions representing graduate employees (also known as academic student employees or ASEs) at universities in Canada and the United States.  The coalition formed in 1992 and each year it organizes a yearly conference at which representatives from graduate employee unions come together to teach and learn from each other about organizing, negotiating contracts, tactics, and mobilization of members.  In past conferences, the delegates spent part of one of the days on the picket line in solidarity with a group of striking workers in the city hosting the conference, but this has not occurred in recent years.  In the period between conferences CGEU provides a forum for graduate employee unions to share information with each other, and maintains a website with information about graduate employee organizing.

The coalition is made up of locals from many different international unions, such as: the American Federation of Teachers, the United Auto Workers, the Communication Workers of America, UNITE HERE, United Electrical Workers, National Education Association, American Association of University Professors, the Service Employees International Union and the Canadian Union of Public Employees, as well as some number of independent unions.

Conferences
The 16th annual CGEU conference took place in the summer of 2007 in Amherst, Massachusetts and was hosted by GEO/UAW.

The 21st annual CGEU conference took place in the summer of 2012 in Vancouver, BC and was hosted by CUPE 2278 and the Teaching Support Staff Union.

The 22nd annual CGEU conference took place in the summer of 2013 in Iowa City, IA and was hosted by COGS.

The 23rd annual CGEU conference took place in the summer of 2014 in Montreal, QC and was hosted by AGSEM.

The 24th annual CGEU conference took place on August 5–8, 2015, in Amherst, MA and was hosted by Graduate Employee Organization (GEO) at University of Massachusetts-Amherst.

The 25th annual CGEU conference will take place on August 13–16, 2016, in Los Angeles, to be hosted by UC Student-Workers Union (UAW 2865) at University of California, Los Angeles.

See also

 List of graduate student employee unions
 National Labor Relations Act
 Rand formula
 2011 Wisconsin protests - initiated by the Teaching Assistants' Association (TAA)
 2012 Quebec student protests
 2009 California college tuition hike protests

External links
 CGEU - CGEU archived websites first, second
 UAW Local 2865 - University of California academic student employee union
 UAW Local 4121 - University of Washington academic student employee union
 UAW Local 2322 - University of Massachusetts Amherst academic student employee union
 TSSU (Website) - Simon Fraser University Teaching Assistant and Sessional employee union

Graduate school trade unions
Trade unions in Canada
Trade unions in the United States
Trade unions established in 1992